Magudu is a town in Ehlanzeni District Municipality in the Mpumalanga province of South Africa.

Formerly known as Magut, it was named after a Tsonga king of the Khoza/Mavona clan in mozambique (Magudu Nkanyini).

References

Populated places in the Nkomazi Local Municipality